Euclasta maceratalis is a moth in the family Crambidae. It was described by Julius Lederer in 1863. It is found in northern Australia, where it has been recorded from Queensland.

The larvae feed on Gymnanthera nitida and Gymnanthera oblonga.

References

Moths described in 1863
Pyraustinae